Stefania Salvemini (born 24 October 1966) is an Italian former basketball player. She competed in the women's tournament at the 1992 Summer Olympics.

References

External links
 

1966 births
Living people
Italian women's basketball players
Olympic basketball players of Italy
Basketball players at the 1992 Summer Olympics
People from San Giovanni Rotondo
Sportspeople from the Province of Foggia